Stefan Drljača (born 20 April 1999) is a German professional footballer who plays as a goalkeeper for 3. Liga club Dynamo Dresden.

Career
Drljača is a youth academy graduate of TSG 1899 Hoffenheim II. In August 2020, he joined Borussia Dortmund II on a two-year deal. He made his professional debut for the team on 5 September 2021 in a 1–0 league win against TSV Havelse.

Personal life
Born in Germany, Drljača is of paternal Bosnian Serb and maternal Croat descent. His father, Nenad Drljača, hails from Bosanski Novi and is a former footballer who played for Serbian club Vojvodina during the Yugoslav First League era. His mother hails from Slavonski Brod.

Honours
Borussia Dortmund II
 Regionalliga West: 2020–21

Borussia Dortmund
 DFB-Pokal: 2020–21

References

External links
 
 

1999 births
Living people
People from Homburg, Saarland
Footballers from Saarland
German people of Croatian descent
German people of Bosnia and Herzegovina descent
German people of Serbian descent
Association football goalkeepers
German footballers
3. Liga players
Regionalliga players
TSG 1899 Hoffenheim II players
Borussia Dortmund II players
Dynamo Dresden players